Fort Mary was a British fort built in 1688 that saw action during Queen Anne's War and was located in Saco, Maine overlooking Winter Harbor / Biddeford Pool.  The fort replaced Fort Saco (1708), which was built at Saco Falls during King William's War. The commander of the fort during King William's War was Captain John Hill.  The fort was attacked in the Northeast Coast Campaign (1703) and natives killed 11 English and took 24 prisoner.  Saco was raided again in 1704 and 1705.  They overwhelmed the garrison in the fort at Winter Harbor (in present-day Biddeford near Biddeford Pool), forcing them to submit to terms of capitulation. Winter Harbor was raided two more times, in 1707 and 1710.

References 

History of Maine
Buildings and structures in Saco, Maine
Point
Buildings and structures completed in 1688
1688 establishments in the Thirteen Colonies